The 2007 Mondial Australian Women's Hardcourts was a women's tennis tournament played on outdoor hard courts. It was the 11th edition of the Brisbane International, and was a Tier III event on the 2007 WTA Tour. It took place in Gold Coast, Queensland, Australia, from 31 December 2006 through 6 January 2007. Second-seeded Dinara Safina won the singles title and earned $25,840 first-prize money.

Points and prize money

Point distribution

Prize money

* per team

WTA entrants

Seeds

Rankings as of 18 December 2006.

Other entrants
The following players received wildcards into the singles main draw:
  Sophie Ferguson
  Shannon Golds
  Nicole Pratt

The following players received entry from the qualifying draw:
  Yuliana Fedak
  Vania King
  Roberta Vinci
  Sandra Záhlavová

Finals

Singles

 Dinara Safina defeated  Martina Hingis, 6–3, 3–6, 7–5
 It was Safina's only singles title of the year and the 5th of her career.

Doubles

 Dinara Safina /  Katarina Srebotnik defeated  Iveta Benešová /  Galina Voskoboeva

External links
 ITF tournament edition details
 Tournament draws

 
Mondial Australian Women's Hardcourts
2007
Mondial Australian Women's Hardcourts
Mondial Australian Women's Hardcourts
Mondial Australian Women's Hardcourts